This is a list of quilters - notable people who are known for their quilts or quilting.

This list is incomplete. You can help by expanding it.


A 

 Nellie Mae Abrams
 Willie Abrams
 Alex Anderson
 Anna Maria Horner

B

 Cuesta Benberry
 Annie Bendolph
 Mary Lee Bendolph
 Agatha Bennett
 Amelia Bennett
 Delia Bennett
 Linda Diane Bennett
 Loretta Pettway Bennett
 Mary L. Bennett
 Polly Bennett
 Janet Catherine Berlo
 Jinny Beyer
 NedRa Bonds
 Georgia Bonesteel
 Sandy Bonsib
 Barbara Brackman
 Tina Williams Brewer
 Jo Budd
 Eleanor Burns
 Bisa Butler

C
Dorothy Caldwell
Jennifer Chiaverini
Jane Burch Cochran
Nancy Crow
Michael Cummings (quilter)

D
Madeline Davis
Mimi Dietrich
Radka Donnell
William Rush Dunton

E 

 Tracey Emin

F
Kaffe Fassett

G 

 Beth Gutcheon

H
Misses Jane and Mary Hampson
Karen Hampton
Peggie Hartwell
Joseph Hedley
Kyra E. Hicks
Susan Hoffman
Mary Ellen Hopkins

J
Michael James (quilt artist)

K
Ai Kijima
Chawne Kimber
Bettye Kimbrell

L
Sophie Tatum LaCroix
Jean Ray Laury
John Lefelhocz
Rosina Lippi

M
Linda MacDonald
Gwendolyn Ann Magee
Gwen Marston
Carolyn L. Mazloomi
Therese May
Dindga McCannon
Susan McCord
Wini McQueen

N
Miriam Nathan-Roberts
Velda Newman

P
Cecelia Pedescleaux
Florence Peto
Louella Pettway
Martha Jane Pettway
Yvonne Porcella
Harriet Powers

R
Sue Reno
Martha Ann Erskine Ricks
Sonié Joi Thompson-Ruffin

S

Rebecca Scattergood Savery
Elizabeth Talford Scott
Joyce J. Scott
Elly Sienkiewicz
Grace Snyder

T
Sarah Mary Taylor
Rosie Lee Tompkins
Holice Turnbow
Patricia Turner
Linda V. Taylor

W
Marilyn I. Walker
Pecolia Warner
Marie Webster
Katherine Westphal
Margaret Wood (fashion designer)

U 

 Molly Upton

V 

 Anna Von Mertens

References

Quilters